Ahmet Derviş also known as Derviş Bey or Derviş Pasha (1881, Yenidje-Vardar (Giannitsa), Salonica Vilayet – January 17, 1932, Istanbul) was an officer of the Ottoman Army and a general of the Turkish Army.

See also
List of high-ranking commanders of the Turkish War of Independence

Sources

1880s births
1932 deaths
People from Salonica vilayet
Macedonian Turks
Ottoman Army officers
Turkish Army generals
Ottoman military personnel of the Italo-Turkish War
Ottoman military personnel of the Balkan Wars
Ottoman military personnel of World War I
Turkish military personnel of the Greco-Turkish War (1919–1922)
Ottoman Military Academy alumni
Ottoman Military College alumni
Recipients of the Medal of Independence with Red Ribbon (Turkey)
Burials at Turkish State Cemetery
People from Giannitsa